The Heartbreaker Demos is a demo version of the album by Barry Gibb. Originally circulating on tape among collectors and later also on CD the album saw a legitimate and wide release on iTunes in October 2006. The album does not include the non-Gibb composition "Our Day Will Come".

Recording sessions
On the start of 1982, Clive Davis asked Gibb to write for Dionne Warwick, who was on his Arista label. Recording songs for Warwick started in February 1982. Gibb and Albhy Galuten repeated their strategy for the Barbra Streisand's album Guilty (1980) recording all of the songs as good quality demos and then recording them again for release. The other songs not included on this album were "Oceans and Rivers", "Broken Bottles", "Never Get Over You" and "Stay Alone". "Stay Alone" was later recorded by Gibb himself for his album Now Voyager (1984) and was also released as a B-side of his 1984 single "Fine Line". Gibb's voice most of the album is falsetto. The outtakes "Oceans and Rivers" and "Broken Bottles" were not used by Warwick and also not included on this album. "Broken Bottles" was released in 2014 on the Expanded Edition of Warwick's 1985 album Finder of Lost Loves. The liner notes state that Barry Manilow produced the track.

In April 1982, Warwick started to record the Heartbreaker album.

Track listing

Personnel
Barry Gibb — vocals, guitar
Albhy Galuten — piano, synthesizer
Uncredited – drums

References

Barry Gibb albums
2006 albums
Demo albums
Albums produced by Barry Gibb